Ivan Reis is a Brazilian comics artist. He is known for his work on comic books such as Dark Horse Comics' Ghost, Marvel Comics' Captain Marvel and Avengers Icons: The Vision and DC Comics' Action Comics, Green Lantern and Aquaman series. According to collaborator Geoff Johns, Reis's drawing style resembles those of Alan Davis and Neal Adams.

Career
For three years, Reis worked for Maurício de Sousa in Brazil. He began his international career for Dark Horse Comics working on Ghost, starting with issue #17 and acting as regular artist until the series concluded with issue #36.  Other work for Dark Horse included The Mask, Time Cop, and Xena. He later worked for Lightning Comics.

At Vertigo, he pencilled an issue of Grant Morrison's The Invisibles. He became better known for Lady Death at Chaos! and CrossGen. At Marvel Comics, Reis worked on The Thing & She-Hulk: The Long Night, Avengers Icons: Vision, Captain Marvel, Iron Man, The Defenders, and The Avengers.

Since 2004 Reis has worked for DC Comics on Action Comics, Teen Titans, Rann–Thanagar War, Superman, and Infinite Crisis. Reis started pencilling Green Lantern vol. 4 with issue #10 (May 2006). Reis left Green Lantern after issue #38 (March 2009) to draw the Blackest Night limited series (June 2009 – May 2010) and its follow-up limited series Brightest Day (July 2010 – June 2011). Reis was the regular penciller of writer Geoff Johns' run on Aquaman vol. 7, which premiered in September 2011. Reis drew it for the first 13 issues before moving to Justice League where he replaced Jim Lee. Johns and Reis introduced the Crime Syndicate of America into the New 52 continuity in Justice League #23 (Oct. 2013). Reis drew the first issue of Grant Morrison's The Multiversity in 2014. Reis drew the first issue of Brian Michael Bendis' The Man of Steel limited series and collaborated with Bendis on the relaunched Superman ongoing series in 2018.

Bibliography

Chaos! Comics
Lady Death:
Alive #2 (with Brian Pulido, 2001)
Dark Alliance #1–3 (with writer John Ostrander, 2002)
Jade #1 (with writer Brian Augustyn, 2002)
Judgement War #3 (with writers Brian Pulido and Len Kaminski, 2000)
Last Rites #4 (with writer John Ostrander, 2002)
The Rapture #2–3 (with writers Brian Pulido and Len Kaminski, 1999)

CrossGen
Crux #21 (2003)
Lady Death: A Medieval Tale #1–6 (with writer Brian Pulido, 2003)

Dark Horse Comics
Ghost #17–25, 28–31, 33–36 (1996–98)
Xena: Warrior Princess #3 (with Mike Deodato) (1999)

DC Comics

Action Comics (Lana Lang) #812; (Superman) #813–819, 822–825 (with writer Chuck Austen, 2004–05)
Aquaman, vol. 7, #1–13, #0 (with writer Geoff Johns, 2011–12)
Batman, vol. 3, #6 (2016)
Blackest Night, miniseries, #0–8 (with writer Geoff Johns, 2009–10)
Blackest Night: Tales of the Corps, miniseries, #3 (with writer Geoff Johns, 2009)
Brightest Day #1–14, 16–24 (with writers Geoff Johns and Peter Tomasi, among other artists, 2010–11)
Countdown to Infinite Crisis #1 (with writer Geoff Johns, 2005)
Cyborg #1–6 (with writer David F. Walker, 2015–16)
DC Comics – The New 52 FCBD Special Edition #1 (among other artists, 2012)
DC Comics: The New 52 Zero Omnibus (cover art, 2012)
DC Universe #0 (among other artists) (2008)
DC Universe: Rebirth #1 (among other artists; and variant cover artist first printing, 2016)
DCU Holiday Special #1 (among other artists) (2009)
52 #22 (Green Lantern backup story, with writer Mark Waid, 2006); #51 (Justice League backup story, with writer Mark Waid, 2007)
Green Lantern, vol. 4, #10–17, 21–25, 29–38, Super Spectacular (with writer Geoff Johns, 2006–11)
Infinite Crisis, miniseries, #4–7 (among other artists) (2005–06)
Infinite Crisis Special: Rann–Thanagar War #1 (with writer Dave Gibbons, 2006)
Justice League, vol. 2, #8, 12, 15–17, 19, 22–24, 26–28, 30, 35 (with writer Geoff Johns, 2012–14)
Justice League of America, vol. 4, #25 (with writer Dwayne McDuffie, among other artists, 2008)
Justice League of America, vol. 5, #1, 4, 12–14, 17 (2017)
Justice League of America: Rebirth #1 (2017)
Justice League of America: The Atom - Rebirth #1 (cover art, 2017)
Justice League of America: Vixen - Rebirth #1 (cover art, 2017)
Justice League of America: The Ray - Rebirth #1 (cover art, 2017)
Justice League of America: Killer Frost- Rebirth #1 (cover art, 2017)
Kamandi Challenge #5 (with writer Bill Willingham, 2017)
The Man of Steel, miniseries, #1 (with writer Brian Michael Bendis, 2018)
The Multiversity #1–2 (with writer Grant Morrison, 2014–15)
Rann–Thanagar War miniseries, #1–6, Special #1 (with writer Dave Gibbons, 2005–06)
Superman, vol. 2, #223 (with writer Mark Verheiden, 2006)
Superman, vol. 4, #14 (2017)
Superman, vol. 5, #1–15, 18-21, 25-28 (2018-2020)
Superman/Batman: Secret Files 2003 (with writer Geoff Johns)
Teen Titans/Outsiders Secret Files 2003 (with writer Geoff Johns)
Teen Titans/Legion Special #1 (with writers Geoff Johns and Mark Waid, 2004)
Untold Tales of Blackest Night #1 (among other artists) (2010)

Vertigo
The Invisibles, vol. 2, #18 (with writer Grant Morrison, 2000)

WildStorm
The Authority vol. 3 #9 (backup story, with writer Christos Gage, 2009)
WildCATS, vol. 2, #9 (backup story, with writer Christos Cage, 2009)

Marvel Comics

The Avengers vol. 3 #52, 64 (with writer Geoff Johns, 2003), Annual 2001 (with writer Kurt Busiek, 2001)
Avengers Icons: The Vision, miniseries, #1–4 (with writer Geoff Johns, 2002)
Captain Marvel vol. 3 #4, 9–12 (with writer Peter David, 2003)
Defenders vol. 2 #12 (backup story, with writers Kurt Busiek and Jo Duffy, 2002)
Quicksilver #7, 9 (1998)
The Supernaturals (with writer Marc Andreyko), five-issue limited series, 1998)
The Thing/She-Hulk: The Long Night #1 (with writer Todd DeZago, 2002)

References

External links

Ivan Reis at Mike's Amazing World of Comics
Ivan Reis at the Unofficial Handbook of Marvel Comics Creators
 

1976 births
20th-century Brazilian artists
20th-century Brazilian male artists
21st-century Brazilian artists
Brazilian art educators
Brazilian comics artists
DC Comics people
Living people
Marvel Comics people